is a Japanese rock band formed from the former member of Do As Infinity, Ryo Owatari. The other two members are twins and were also members with Ryo from their previous band, Pee-Ka-Boo. While most of Do As Infinity and Tomiko Van (Owatari's former bandmate)'s music are both under the pop/pop-rock sound, Missile Innovation's music falls into the rock/punk-rock genre.

Members
 Vocals & Guitar : Ryo Owatari
 Drums & Chorus : Hisayoshi Hayashi
 Bass & Chorus : Yoshiyasu Hayashi

Hisayoshi Hayashi and Yoshiyasu Hayashi are twins. Yoshiyasu Hayashi had played at some tour of Do As Infinity as a support member.

Discography

Singles

EPs

Albums

External links
 Missile Innovation Official Site

Missile Innovation
Japanese rock music groups
Missile Innovation